Mudi Prajith (born 27 August 1989) is an Indian first-class cricketer who plays for Andhra. He made his first-class debut for Andhra in the 2016-17 Ranji Trophy on 7 December 2016.

References

External links
 

1989 births
Living people
Indian cricketers
Andhra cricketers